Kanwarjit Paintal, better known as Paintal (born 22 August 1948), is an Indian actor and comedian. He started off as a comic actor and moved on to teaching the art of acting. He has extensively worked not only in numerous movies but also television.
He was born into a Sikh family in a village named Tarn Taran which is near Amritsar, Punjab. He lived his early life with his family members in Sadar Bazaar, Delhi. Paintal learnt acting at the Film and Television Institute of India and in 2008 was the Head of the Acting Department of FTII. He came to Bombay (now Mumbai) in 1969. His brother Gufi Paintal played the role Shakuni in B.R. Chopra hit show 'Mahabharat (1988 TV series)', in which he himself played the roles of Shikhandi and Sudama. His son, Hiten Paintal, is also an actor, who worked in movies such as Dil Maange More (2004) and Bachna Ae Haseeno (2008).

Filmography
Some of Paintal's notable roles included Rattan in Jawani Diwani (1972), Salma in Rafoo Chakkar (1975), Guruji in Bawarchi (1972), Arun in Piya Ka Ghar (1972), Panditji (Astrologer) in Parichay (1972), Totaram in Jangal Mein Mangal (1972), Kamal in Heera Panna (1973), Headmaster in Roti (1974), Ramu in Khote Sikkay (1973), and Budh Anand in Satte Pe Satta (1982). One of his most notable roles was as Champak Boomia in Aaj Ki Taaza Khabar (1973). The film became very successful for the character 'Champak Bhumia' played by him. From playing comic roles, Paintal has moved on to play serious character roles, most recent of which is in the television drama Pyar Ka Dard Hain Kuch Meetha Meetha.

Bollywood films
 Umang (1970)
 Lal Patthar(1971)
 Mere Apne (1971)
 Pyar Ki Kahani (1971)
 Tangewala (1972)
 Shaadi Ke Baad (1972)
 Jawani Diwani (1972) – Rattan
 Gomti Ke Kinare (1972)
 Bawarchi (1972) – Guruji
 Piya Ka Ghar (1972) – Arun
 Parichay (1972) – Panditji (Astrologer)
 Jangal Mein Mangal (1972) – Totaram
 Heera Panna (1974) – Kamal
 Aaj Ki Taaza Khabar (1973) – Champak Boomia
 Zehreela Insaan (1974)
 Us-Paar (1974)
 Manoranjan (1974)
 Kora Badan (1974)
 Khote Sikkay (1973)
 Faslah (1974)
 Dulhan (1974)
 Dil Diwana (1974)
 Call Girl (1974)
 Roti (1974) – Headmaster
  Gulabi Nain Sharabi (1974) Raja 
 Rafoo Chakkar (1975) – Salma
 Mazaaq (1975)
 Jaggu (1975)
 Apne Rang hazaar (1975)
 Anokha (1975) – Raja
 Maa (1976)
 Laila Majnu (1976)
 Deewangee (1976)
 Balika Badhu (1976) – Shambhu
 Bairaag (1976)
 Jaaneman (1976)
 Udhar Ka Sindur (1976)
 Shirdi Ke Sai Baba (1977)
 Saheb Bahadur (1977)
 Saal Solvan Chadya (1977)
 Jay Vejay (1977)
 Jagriti (1977)
 Chandi Sona (1977)
 Chala Murari Hero Banne
 Alibaba Marjinaa (1977)
 Abhi To Jee Lein (1977)
 Tumhari Kasam (1978)
 Swarg Narak (1978) – Shambhu
 Phool Khile Hain Gulshan Gulshan (1978)
 Naya Daur (1978)
 Muqaddar (1978)
 Des Pardes (1978)
 College Girl (1978)
 Ankh Ka Tara (1978)
 Aakhri Daku (1978)
 Aahuti (1978)
 Adventures of Aladdin (1978)
 Magroor (1979)
 Jaani Dushman (1979)
 Jaan-E-Bahaar (1979)
 Gopal Krishna (1979)
 Duniya Meri Jeb Mein (1979)
 Khoon Kharaba (1980)
 The Burning Train (1980)
 Sitara (1980)
 Oh Bewafa (1980)
 Dostana (1980)
 Waqt Ki Deewar (1981)
 Saajan Ki Saheli (1981)
 Ghamandee (1981)
 Kranti (1981)
 Daasi (1981)
 Kachche Heere (1982)
 Baghavat (1982)
 Satte Pe Satta (1982) – Budh Anand
 Teri Kasam (1982)
 Teri Maang Sitaron Se Bhar Doon (1982)
 Shubh Kaamna (1983)
 Ganga Meri Maa (1983)
 Sadma (1983)
 Daulat Ke Dushman (1983) (Special Appearance) 
 Kalaakaar (1983)
 Waqt Ki Pukar (1984)
 Shapath (1984)
 Maan Maryada (1984)
 Kanoon Meri Mutthi Mein (1984)
 Jaag Utha Insaan (1984)
 Hum Do Hamare Do (1984)
 Ram Tere Kitne Nam (1985)
 Paisa Yeh Paisa (1985)
 Kali Basti (1985)
 Aandhi-Toofan (1985)
 Mehak (1985)
 Wafadaar (1985)
 Bepanaah (1985)
 Sur Sangam (1985)
 Babu (1985)
 Mujhe Kasam Hai (1985) — Gopi
 Mohabbat Ki Kasam (1986)
 Kirayadar (1986)
 Adhikar (1986)
 Dilwala (1986)
 Zindagani (1986)
 Teesra Kinara (1986)
 Anubhav (1986 film) (1986)
 Insaniyat Ke Dushman (1987)
 Maashuka (1987)
 Paap Ki Duniya (1988)
 Jeete Hain Shaan Se (1988)
 Akhri Muqabla (1988)
 Mitti Aur Sona (1989)
 Jaaydaad (1989)
 Jaisi Karni Waisi Bharni (1989)
 Shehzaade (1989) (uncredited)
 Anokha Aspatal (1989) Ram Dhani 
 Pyasi Nigahen (1990)
 Aag Ka Gola (1990) (uncredited)
 Pyaar Ke Naam Qurban (1990)
 Thanedaar (1990)
 Qurbani Rang Layegi (1991)
 First Love Letter (1991)
 Saugandh (1991)
 Prem Deewane (1992)
 Mehboob Mere Mehboob (1992)
 Pehchaan (1993)
 Anokha Premyudh (1994)
 Prem Yog (1994)
 Amaanat (1994)
 Ikke Pe Ikka (1994)
 Aazmayish (1995)
 Rock Dancer (1995)
 Aisi Bhi Kya Jaldi Hai (1996)
 Megha (1996) (uncredited)
 Mere Sapno Ki Rani (1997)
 Hatyara (1998)
 Zulm-O-Sitam (1998)
 Kasam (2001)
 Fun 2shh: Dudes in the 10th Century (2003)
 Paying Guests (2009)
 Shri Chaitanya Mahaprabhu (2009) (Special Appearance) 
 Kaalo (2010)
 30 MINUTES (Hindi Film) (2016)
 Kahani Rubberband Ki (2022)

TV career
 Vikram Aur Betaal as Dagdoo
 Ssshhhh...Koi Hai-Bhediya as Werewolf
 Ssshhhh...Koi Hai-Khoj
 Mahabharat on DD National (October 1988 – June 1990) – Sudama and  Shikhandi
Jai Mata Ki sage Narada
 Daal Mein Kala on Star Plus (1988) as Various characters
 NatKhat on Zee TV (1994)
 Pyar Zindagi Hai on Zee TV (2003)
 Ladoo Singh Taxiwala (1976 The first ever doordarshan serial)
  CID (Indian TV series)  as Ghanashyam in Episode 409
 Amber Dhara on Sony TV (September 2007 – April 2008) – Mahendra Pratap Dixit
 Pyaar Ka Dard Hai Meetha Meetha Pyaara Pyaara  on (Star Plus) as Jagdish Prasad Gupta (2012–14) 
 Ek Shringaar-Swabhiman on Colors TV as Sujan Singh Chauhan (2016–17)
 Piya Albela on Zee TV (2017–18) as Kashinath Vyas
 Partners Trouble Ho Gayi Double (2017) - Special Appearance
Shakti - Astitva Ke Ehsaas Ki on Colors TV as Baksh Singh (2020)
 Kabhi Kabhie Ittefaq Sey on StarPlus as Charudutt Kulshresta

Awards and nominations

|-
| 1973
| Bawarchi
| rowspan="2"|Filmfare Award for Best Performance in a Comic Role
| 
|-
| 1978
| Chala Murari Hero Banne
| 
|}

References

External links
 
  Shikhandi a pivotal character

Indian male comedians
Filmfare Awards winners
Living people
1948 births